Sarvepalli Gopal (23 April 1923 – 20 April 2002) was a well-known Indian historian. He was the son of Sarvepalli Radhakrishnan, the first Vice-President and the second President of India.  He was the author of the Radhakrishnan: A Biography and Jawaharlal Nehru: A Biography.

Early life and education
Sarvepalli Gopal was born in Madras, India, on 23 April 1923 into a middle class family. He was the only son of S. Radhakrishnan, the first vice-president and second president of independent India, and Sivakamu. He had five sisters.

Gopal was educated at Mill Hill School in London and at the Madras Christian College. He was an undergraduate student of history at Balliol College, Oxford, where he won the Curzon Prize. He continued as a student at Balliol earning his PhD on the viceroyalty of Lord Ripon in 1951.

Career
Subsequently, he was appointed as a Director in the Ministry of External Affairs, Government of India, in the 1950s, where he worked closely with Prime Minister Jawaharlal Nehru. In the 1960s, he was a Reader in Indian History at St Antony's College, Oxford. When the new Jawaharlal Nehru University was founded by the then Prime Minister, Indira Gandhi, he was appointed as a Professor of History at the Centre for Historical Studies, which he helped in setting up. In the 1970s, he was a Chairman of the National Book Trust, New Delhi.

Death
Gopal died due to renal failure in Chennai on 20 April 2002, three days before his 79th birthday.

Publications

Books

History of Humanity: Scientific and Cultural Development, Vol. 7: The Twentieth Century, (Paris: UNESCO, Routledge, 2008) (co-author Tichvinskii, Sergei Leonidovich)
Jawaharlal Nehru: A Biography, (Delhi: Oxford University Press, 2004)
The Essential Writings of Jawaharlal Nehru, (New Delhi: Oxford University Press, 2003) (co-author Uma Iyengar)
Anatomy of Confrontation: The Babri Masjid Ramjanmabhumi Issue, (New Delhi: Viking, 1991)
Radhakrishnan: A Biography, (Delhi: Oxford University Press, 1992)
Economy, Society and Development: Essays and Reflections in Honour of Malcolm Adesheshiah, (New Delhi: Sage, 1991) (co-authors Kurien, C.T., E.R. Prabhakar)
Jawaharlal Nehru: An Anthology, (Delhi: Oxford University Press, 1983)
Selected Works of Jawaharlal Nehru, (New Delhi: Orient Longman, 1972–82) (co-authors Chalapatti Rau, M., Sharada Prasad, H.Y., Nanda, B.R.)
British Policy in India, 1858-1905, (Cambridge: Cambridge University Press, 1965)
Modern India, (London: Historical Association, 1967)
The Viceroyalty of Lord Irwin, 1926-1931, (Oxford: Clarendon Press, 1957)
The Viceroyalty of Lord Ripon, 1880-1884, (London: Oxford University Press, 1957)
The Permanent Settlement in Bengal and its Result, (London, G.Allen and Unwin, 1949)

References

1923 births
2002 deaths
20th-century Indian historians
Alumni of Balliol College, Oxford
Children of presidents of India
Deaths from kidney failure
Fellows of St Antony's College, Oxford
Historians of South Asia
Indian civil servants
Academic staff of Jawaharlal Nehru University
Madras Christian College alumni
People educated at Mill Hill School
Place of birth missing
Place of death missing
Recipients of the Padma Vibhushan in literature & education
Recipients of the Sahitya Akademi Award in English
Scholars from Chennai
Telugu people
University of Madras alumni